Stanley Dwayne Brundy (born November 13, 1967) is an American-Israeli former professional basketball player. He was selected by the New Jersey Nets in the second round (32nd pick overall) of the 1989 NBA draft. A 6' 6" (1.98 m) and 210 lb (95 kg) forward from DePaul University, Brundy played in just one NBA season for the Nets (1989–90), averaging 2.3 points and 1.6 rebounds a game. He was suspended for the majority of that season after failing a drug test.

He has played in the CBA (where he was Newcomer of the Year in 1992), Venezuela, Colombia, Turkey (2nd division), the Philippines, France (2nd division), and Israel. He was the top rebounder in the Israel Basketball Premier League in four seasons: 2000–02 and 2005.

References

External links
Stanley Brundy TheDraftReview profile
Stanley Brundy NBA statistics, basketballreference.com
Stanley Brundy's profile @Safsal.co.il  (in Hebrew)

1967 births
Living people
African-American basketball players
American expatriate basketball people in Colombia
American expatriate basketball people in France
American expatriate basketball people in Israel
American expatriate basketball people in the Philippines
American expatriate basketball people in Turkey
American expatriate basketball people in Venezuela
American men's basketball players
Basketball players from New Orleans
Bnei HaSharon players
DePaul Blue Demons men's basketball players
Ironi Ashkelon players
Israeli American
Maccabi Haifa B.C. players
New Jersey Nets draft picks
New Jersey Nets players
Power forwards (basketball)
Rapid City Thrillers players
Trotamundos B.B.C. players
Crenshaw High School alumni
National Basketball Association players from Israel
21st-century African-American people
20th-century African-American sportspeople